The 2008–09 Spartan South Midlands Football League season is the 12th in the history of Spartan South Midlands Football League a football competition in England.

Premier Division

The Premier Division featured 19 clubs which competed in the division last season, along with three new clubs:

Berkhamsted Town, relegated from the Southern Football League
Haringey Borough, promoted from Division One
Kentish Town, promoted from Division One

League table

Division One

Division One featured 16 clubs which competed in the division last season, along with five new clubs.
Two clubs relegated from the Premier Division:
London Colney
Ruislip Manor

Two clubs promoted from Division Two:
Crawley Green Sports
Kings Langley

Plus:
Hatfield Town, joined from the Herts County League

Also, Ruislip Manor changed name to Tokyngton Manor.

League table

Division Two

Division Two featured 13 clubs, which competed in the division last season, along with five new clubs:
Bletchley Town, joined from the North Bucks & District Football League
Bucks Student Union
Hadley, joined from the West Herts Saturday League
Milton Keynes Wanderers, joined from the North Bucks & District Football League
Wodson Park, joined from the Herts County League

League table

References

External links
 Spartan South Midlands Football League

2008–09
9